The municipality of Baltasar Brum is one of the three municipalities of Artigas Department. Its seat is the city of Baltasar Brum.

Location 
The municipality is located in the southwest area of the Artigas Department.

History 
The municipality of Baltasar Brum was created by Law N° 18653 of 15 March 2010, in compliance with the provisions of the Law N° 18567, that provided for the establishment of municipalities in all of the settlements with 2000 or more inhabitants. It is part of the Artigas Department and comprises the ICA constituency of that department.

Settlements 
The only populated place part of this municipality is Baltasar Brum.

Authorities 
The authority of the municipality is the Municipal Council, integrated by the Mayor (who presides it) and four Councilors.

References 

Baltasar Brum